Words from the Genius is the debut studio album by the American rapper GZA, under his previous stage name "The Genius". The album never charted, and GZA went on to co-found the Wu-Tang Clan in 1992 after the album's failure.

Album background
It was released on February 19, 1991. It is significant as one of the few albums released by a Wu-Tang Clan member before the founding of the group in late 1992 and one of only two pre- Wu-Tang clan releases any of the members recorded with a major label (the other is Ooh, I Love You, Rakeem EP by Prince Rakeem (RZA).

Album re-release
It was re-released in 1994, with the song "Come Do Me" replaced by "Pass the Bone." Both versions are now out of print. In 2006, an expanded version was released by Traffic Entertainment Group, the owner of the bulk of the Cold Chillin' Records catalog.

"I was signed to Cold Chillin' 'bout five years ago," GZA recalled in 1995. "They put out an album but didn't promote it. They tried to put it out again last year after everything happened with the Clan, put a '94 date on it, but still didn't put any money behind it, so it didn't sell twice. I'm still proud of it, though. The beats ain't all that but, lyrically, shit was bangin'. So it wasn't all peaches and cream, but I was determined to break through. 'A quitter never wins, and a winner never quits.'"

Track listing

References

1991 debut albums
GZA albums
Albums produced by Easy Mo Bee
Albums produced by RZA
Cold Chillin' Records albums